Turushla (Töröşlö) is a rural locality (a village) in Ilyino-Polyansky Selsoviet, Blagoveshchensky District, Bashkortostan, Russia. The population was 351 as of 2010. There are 3 streets.

Geography 
Turushla is located 22 km east of Blagoveshchensk (the district's administrative centre) by road. Pekarskaya is the nearest rural locality.

References 

Rural localities in Blagoveshchensky District
Ufa Governorate